The 2019 Columbus Crew SC season was the club's twenty-fourth season of existence and their twenty-fourth consecutive season in Major League Soccer, the top flight of American soccer. Columbus also competed in the U.S. Open Cup and took part in the Carolina Challenge Cup during preseason. The season covered the period from November 12, 2018 to the start of the 2020 Major League Soccer season.

Roster

Non-competitive

Preseason
On December 21, 2018, Crew SC officially announced its preseason schedule, with three confirmed matches. The club began preseason by spending two days in Lewis Center, Ohio before traveling to Chula Vista, California for a week-long training camp. While in California, Crew SC played a friendly match against Japanese club Vissel Kobe. After another week in Ohio, Columbus will then play in the Carolina Challenge Cup, looking to defend their title in the tournament for the third consecutive season. Crew SC will play a pair of rivals in the CCC, facing Chicago Fire and FC Cincinnati, as well as the tournament hosts.

Columbus announced the addition of two friendly matches on January 21, both taking place while the club trains in California and behind closed doors. Crew SC played Mexican club Tijuana on January 31 before facing fellow MLS side Los Angeles FC on February 4. Both matches were open to media but closed to the public.

Competitive

MLS

Standings

Eastern Conference

Overall table

Results summary

Results by round

Match results
On December 20, 2018, the league announced the home openers for every club. Columbus will make their season debut at Mapfre Stadium on the opening day of the season, playing host to New York Red Bulls – the team that eliminated Crew SC from the playoffs in 2017. Columbus will also take part in the home-opening matches for two other clubs, with a trip to Gillette Stadium to face New England Revolution on March 9 and a visit to Saputo Stadium to take on Montreal Impact on April 13.

The schedule for the remainder of the season was released by the league on January 7, 2019. Crew SC will play twice against every Eastern Conference opponent and once against every Western Conference team.

U.S. Open Cup

Statistics

Appearances and goals
Federico Higuaín entered the season with 196 career appearances for Crew SC, good for eighth place all-time, and 58 goals for the club, good for third place. In order to move up the charts in each category, he needed to appear in four matches and score 17 goals. He appeared for the fourth time on the season on March 23, moving up the charts in the Crew's defeat against Philadelphia Union.

Justin Meram also came into the 2019 season sitting in the top ten in club history in both appearances and goals: his 225 appearances were good for fifth place in club history, and his 43 goals were good for sixth. In order to move up, Meram needed to play in 17 games and score 10 goals. He was traded on May 7, however, after playing just nine matches without scoring, departing without moving up in either category.

Club captain Wil Trapp was tenth place in club history in appearances coming into the season, with 177 games played for the Crew. In order to move up, he needed to appear at least 11 times in all competitions. Trapp made his 11th appearance on May 8, starting in the club's victory against LA Galaxy.

|-
|colspan=10 align=center|Players who left Columbus during the season:

|}

Disciplinary record

Clean sheets
Zack Steffen came into the season with the fifth-most shutouts in club history, keeping 22 through his first three seasons with the club. In order to move up on the all-time charts, he needed to keep two clean sheets in 2019. Steffen accomplished that mark in just three matches, moving up the chart following a clean sheet against FC Dallas on March 16.

Transfers

In

SuperDraft

The following players were selected by Columbus in the MLS SuperDraft, but did not sign a contract with the club. Crew SC passed with the 91st overall pick.

Out

Loan out

Awards

Kits

See also
 Columbus Crew SC
 2019 in American soccer
 2019 Major League Soccer season

References

Columbus Crew seasons
Columbus Crew SC
Columbus Crew SC
Columbus Crew SC